Heine Araújo (born ) is a retired Brazilian female artistic gymnast, who represented her nation at international competitions.  She participated at the 2001 World Artistic Gymnastics Championships in Ghent, Belgium.

Eponymous skill 
Araújo has one eponymous skill listed in the Code of Points.

References

1984 births
Living people
Brazilian female artistic gymnasts
Gymnasts at the 1999 Pan American Games
Originators of elements in artistic gymnastics
Pan American Games bronze medalists for Brazil
Pan American Games medalists in gymnastics
Medalists at the 1999 Pan American Games
20th-century Brazilian women
21st-century Brazilian women